Simon Chèvre d'Or was poet and a canon at the Abbey of St. Victor, Paris in the 12th century. It is believed that Simon was commissioned by Henry I, Count of Champagne to write three poems in Latin based on the Trojan Wars including a summary of the Aeneid and the Iliad. In his Ylias, Simon drew on Joseph of Exeter's work Frigii Daretis Yliados libri sex as well as Virgil's Aeneid. The largest version of this poem runs to 994 verses. Albert C. Friend has argued that Chaucer, in turn, relied on Simon's work along with the original version by Virgil for his own retelling of the Aeneid. Simon is also credited with the composition of a series of epitaphs dedicated to Saint Bernard.

References

Bibliography 

12th-century French writers
12th-century French Roman Catholic priests
French male writers
12th-century Latin writers
12th-century French poets